The 2021 Stetson Hatters football team represented Stetson University in the 2021 NCAA Division I FCS football season as a member of the Pioneer Football League. They 
were led by first-year head coach Brian Young and played their home games at Spec Martin Stadium.

Schedule

Notes

References

Stetson
Stetson Hatters football seasons
Stetson Hatters football